The Zeppelin C.I (sometimes Zeppelin (Jaray) C.I or Zeppelin-Friedrichshafen C.I) was a German single-engine two-seat biplane, designed by Paul Jaray and built by Zeppelin in World War I. Friedrichshafen referred to the location of the Zeppelin factory where development occurred, and was not connected with the aircraft manufacturer of that name.

Development
The structure of the C.I was wood with a fabric covering, while the C.II had a metal structure, and dispensed with the horn balance on the rudder.

Specifications

References

Citations

Bibliography

1910s German aircraft
Biplanes
Aircraft first flown in 1917